James Edwin Hargrove (born October 5, 1953) is an American forester and politician who served as a member of the Washington State Senate, representing the 24th district from 1993 to 2017. A member of the Democratic Party, he previously served as a member of the Washington House of Representatives from 1985 to 1993.

Hargrove was a member of the Family Policy Council, Children's Oversight, Child Safety for Children in Child Protective Services or Child Welfare Services, Judiciary, and Natural Resources & Marine Waters committees. He was the chair of the Human Services and Corrections and Western Legislative Forestry Task Force committees.

References

External links
Sen. Hargrove

Members of the Washington House of Representatives
1953 births
Living people
Washington (state) state senators
21st-century American politicians
Oregon State University alumni
Oregon Democrats
Washington (state) Democrats